Paul Thompson is an Australian broadcasting executive.

Career
He has launched, acquired, developed and managed broadcasting stations and networks throughout Australia in a career which started in 1965. He is credited with building two distinct national radio broadcasting networks from inception.

Having established Adelaide's first commercial FM radio station "Double S A FM" in the 1980s (later known as SAFM), he was responsible for setting up the Austereo Radio Network (now known as Southern Cross Austereo), which he guided as CEO for 15 years. In 1996, dmg Radio Australia was launched with Thompson as CEO.

Now known as NOVA Entertainment and owned by Lachlan Murdoch, the company owns the CHR-formatted radio network Nova (with stations targeting under-40 listeners in Sydney, Melbourne, Brisbane, Adelaide and Perth), along with the smoothfm network (aimed at older listeners) in Sydney and Melbourne, Star 104.5 on the Central Coast (New South Wales) and Adelaide’s only commercial talk station FIVEaa.

Thompson was one of two inaugural inductees in the Commercial Radio Australia "Hall of Fame" in 2002 and is regarded as the 'father' of FM broadcasting in particular in Australia.

In 2008 he stepped down as Executive Chairman of dmg Radio Australia, telling radioinfo: "It is far too easy for a founding CEO to stay too long. It is healthier for an organisation for the founder to leave too early than stay too late. The transition from radio broadcasting to multi-platform delivery and the launch of digital radio combine to create a natural watershed. And Cath is ready to go as CEO."

Notes

Year of birth missing (living people)
Living people
Australian radio executives
Nova Entertainment